Arthur Massey Stone (born 19 December 1960) is a former New Zealand rugby union player. A second five-eighth and centre, Stone represented Waikato, Bay of Plenty, and Otago at a provincial level, and was a member of the New Zealand national side, the All Blacks, from 1981 to 1985. He played 23 matches for the All Blacks including nine internationals, scoring five tries and one dropped goal. He also played 27 games for the New Zealand Maori team.

Ranfurly Shield winning try 
Arthur Stone, as a nineteen year old, scored the only try in Waikato's Ranfurly Shield challenge against holders Auckland in 1980. In front of a crowd of 47,000, second division Waikato won the shield as a result 7–3.  Arthur Stone intercepted an Auckland pass and scored in the left hand corner. Keith Quinn, providing the television commentary said "Has he got the legs? Arthur Stone. He's just having a go…now that is a great try for nineteen year-old Arthur Stone."

Otago 
Arthur Stone moved south to Dunedin in 1987 and played for Otago for seven years. He played in the 1991 Otago team that won the first division championship playing in 16 games that season for Otago and scoring six tries. He played club rugby for Pirates and Kaikorai.

Building Career 
Since retiring from rugby, Stone has run a building and building contracting company in Dunedin.

References

1960 births
Living people
Rugby union players from Auckland
People educated at Rotorua Boys' High School
People educated at Trident High School
New Zealand international rugby union players
New Zealand rugby union players
Waikato rugby union players
Bay of Plenty rugby union players
Otago rugby union players
Māori All Blacks players
Rugby union centres